The 2022 Southeastern Conference softball tournament was postseason softball tournament that determined the 2022 champion of the Southeastern Conference. It was held at Katie Seashole Pressly Stadium on the campus of the University of Florida in Gainesville, Florida, from May 10–14, 2022. As he tournament winner, Arkansas earned the Southeastern Conference's automatic bid to the 2022 NCAA Division I softball tournament. The championship game, as well as the semifinals, were broadcast on ESPN2, while all other tournament games were televised on the SEC Network.

Format
All thirteen teams will be seeded based on conference winning percentage.  They then will play a single-elimination tournament, with the top four seeds receiving a single bye, and the bottom two playing the first-round game on May 10.

Bracket

References

SEC softball tournament
Southeastern Conference softball seasons
tournament
Southeastern Conference softball tournament
Southeastern Conference softball tournament